The 2016–17 Dartmouth Big Green men's basketball team represented Dartmouth College during the 2016–17 NCAA Division I men's basketball season. The Big Green, led by first-year head coach David McLaughlin, played their home games at Leede Arena in Hanover, New Hampshire and were members of the Ivy League. They finished the season 7–20, 4–10 in Ivy League play to finish in a three-way tie for last place. They failed to qualify for the inaugural Ivy League tournament.

Previous season
The Big Green finished the 2015–16 season with a 10–18 record overall and 4–10 in the conference.

On March 21, 2016 head coach Paul Cormier was fired. He finished at Dartmouth with a six-year record of 54–116. On April 25, the school hired David McLaughlin as head coach.

Offseason

Departures

2016 recruiting class

2017 recruiting class

Roster

}

Schedule and results

|-
!colspan=9 style=| Non-conference regular season

|-
!colspan=9 style=| Ivy League regular season

References

Dartmouth Big Green men's basketball seasons
Dartmouth
Dart
Dart